The Book of Vision is a 2020 psychological drama film directed by Carlo S. Hintermann (in his narrative feature directorial debut) and starring Charles Dance, Lotte Verbeek and Sverrir Gudnason. Terrence Malick serves as an executive producer.

It was selected as the opening film of the International Critics' Week at the 77th Venice International Film Festival.

Plot 
In present day, young doctor Eva leaves her promising career behind to study history of medicine, questioning everything from her nature to her body, her illness and sealed fate. Johan Anmuth is an 18th-century Prussian physician in perpetual struggle between the rise of rationalism and ancient forms of animism. The Book of Vision is a manuscript that sweeps these two existences up, blending them into a never-ending vortex. Nothing expires in its time. Only what you desire is real, not merely what happens.

Cast 
 Charles Dance as Johan Anmuth
 Lotte Verbeek as Eva / Elizabeth
 Sverrir Gudnason as Dr Nils Lindgren
 Filippo Nigro
 Isolda Dychauk
 Rocco Gottlieb
 Justin Korovkin as Günter
 Giselda Volodi
 Vera Graziadei as Rivka Sorkin / Mrs Dobileit

References

External links
 

2020 films
2020 drama films
2020s psychological drama films
Belgian drama films
British psychological drama films
Italian psychological drama films
Films about dreams
Films about psychoanalysis
Films shot in Belgium
Films shot in Italy
Films set in the 18th century
2020s English-language films
2020s British films
2020s Italian films